François Abadie (19 June 1930, in Lourdes, Hautes-Pyrénées – 2 March 2001, in Paris) was a French politician. A former mayor of Lourdes, Abadie represented the 
Hautes-Pyrénées region in the French senate.

National mandates
Deputy for Hautes-Pyrénées (representing Radical Party of the Left) 1973–1981
Senator for Hautes-Pyrénées 1983–2001
Mayor of Lourdes 1971–1989

Ministerial functions
Minister of Tourism 22 May 1981 – 24 March 1983

Parliamentary function
Member of the Department of Cultural Affairs

References

External links 
  Senate profile

1930 births
2001 deaths
People from Lourdes
Politicians from Occitania (administrative region)
Radical Party of the Left politicians
Government ministers of France
Deputies of the 5th National Assembly of the French Fifth Republic
Deputies of the 6th National Assembly of the French Fifth Republic
Deputies of the 7th National Assembly of the French Fifth Republic
French Senators of the Fifth Republic
Senators of Hautes-Pyrénées
Mayors of places in Occitania (administrative region)